Aban Offshore (formerly Aban Loyd Chiles Offshore Ltd.), is Indian multinational offshore drilling services provider headquartered in Chennai, India. Its services are mainly used by oil companies, especially for ONGC. It is now ventured into international waters as one of its five rigs is doing work for an Iranian oil company. The company listed on the Bombay Stock Exchange Ltd.

The group has also ventured into construction, offshore and onshore drilling, wind energy and power generation, Information Technology enabled services, hotels and resorts, tea plantations and in marketing.

Financials 
In 2021, the company reported consolidated net loss of Rs 1972.53 crore.

References

External links 
 

Service companies of India
Drilling rig operators
Companies based in Chennai
1986 establishments in Tamil Nadu
Indian companies established in 1986
Companies listed on the National Stock Exchange of India
Companies listed on the Bombay Stock Exchange